The British Virgin Islands competed at the 2016 Summer Olympics in Rio de Janeiro, Brazil, from 5 to 21 August 2016. This was the nation's ninth consecutive appearance at the Summer Olympics.

British Virgin Islands Olympic Committee sent the nation's largest delegation to the Games since 1996. Four athletes, one man and three women, were selected to the British Virgin Islands team, participating only in both track and field and swimming. Tahesia Harrigan-Scott (women's 100 m) etched her name into the history books as the first-ever female athlete for the British Virgin Islands to compete in three successive Olympic Games, while the rest of her teammates made their debut in Rio de Janeiro, including shot putter Eldred Henry, 16-year-old swimmer Elinah Phillip (women's 50 m freestyle), and Harrigan-Scott's fellow sprinter Ashley Kelly (women's 200 m), who subsequently acted as the nation's flag bearer in the opening ceremony. British Virgin Islands, however, has yet to win its first Olympic medal.

Athletics (track and field)

Athletes from British Virgin Islands achieved qualifying standards in the following athletics events (up to a maximum of 3 athletes in each event):

Track & road events

Field events

Swimming

British Virgin Islands received a Universality invitation from FINA to send a female swimmer to the Olympics, signifying the nation's Olympic debut in the sport.

See also
British Virgin Islands at the 2015 Pan American Games

References

External links 
 
 

Nations at the 2016 Summer Olympics
2016
2016 in British Virgin Islands sport